The .345 Winchester Self-Loading (colloquially .345 WSL or eventually .345 Winchester Machine Rifle) is a rimless, rifle fire cartridge in a "cylindrical" shape, created in 1917 by the Winchester Repeating Arms Company.

It was designed for aircraft use, but there was also an alternate barrel with bayonet attachment for ground use. The rifle was the Winchester-Burton Machine Rifle, also known as the Winchester Model 1917 and was developed by Frank F. Burton. Little documentation on the rifle survives, but it was believed to have been intended for use as an anti-balloon weapon.

History

During the outbreak of the First World War, observation balloons were essential for both sides of the front. These static balloons inflated with hydrogen, became targets for airmen on both sides, and were defended by anti-aircraft batteries and patrol fighters.

To face these balloons, conventional ammunition proved to be inefficient, and other alternatives were sought. In 1916, French officer Yves le Prieur created a rocket system powered by electricity, but its range was limited. In 1917, tracer and incendiary ammunition was being developed to target these balloons.

To meet this need, Frank F. Burton of Winchester, developed the "Burton Light Machine Rifle", a selective fire blowback rifle, with selection of rate of fire to be used in observation and surveillance planes, the first practical version of which was ready in 1917. For this rifle, he adapted the .351 WSL cartridge into a rimless cartridge, firing an incendiary Spitzer bullet, resulting in the .345 Winchester Self-Loading.

Dimensions

See also
 9 mm caliber
 .35 Remington
 List of rifle cartridges
 Table of handgun and rifle cartridges

References

External links

 America's First Assault Rifle

Pistol and rifle cartridges
Winchester Repeating Arms Company cartridges